Mohammad Khalaj (also Romanized as Moḩammad Khalaj; also known as Muhammad Khalach) is a village in Bizineh Rud Rural District, Bizineh Rud District, Khodabandeh County, Zanjan Province, Iran. At the 2006 census, its population was 2,814, in 608 families.

References 

Populated places in Khodabandeh County